Ergotamine, sold under the brand names Cafergot (with caffeine) and Ergomar among others, is an ergopeptine and part of the ergot family of alkaloids; it is structurally and biochemically closely related to ergoline. It possesses structural similarity to several neurotransmitters, and has biological activity as a vasoconstrictor.

It is used medicinally for treatment of acute migraine attacks (sometimes in combination with caffeine). Medicinal usage of ergot fungus began in the 16th century to induce childbirth, yet dosage uncertainties discouraged the use. It has been used to prevent post-partum hemorrhage (bleeding after childbirth).  It was first isolated from the ergot fungus by Arthur Stoll at Sandoz in 1918 and marketed as Gynergen in 1921.

Biosynthesis
Ergotamine is a secondary metabolite (natural product) and the principal alkaloid produced by the ergot fungus, Claviceps purpurea, and related fungi in the family Clavicipitaceae. Its biosynthesis in these fungi requires the amino acid L-tryptophan and dimethylallyl pyrophosphate. These precursor compounds are the substrates for the enzyme, tryptophan dimethylallyltransferase, catalyzing the first step in ergot alkaloid biosynthesis, i.e., the prenylation of L-tryptophan. Further reactions, involving methyltransferase and oxygenase enzymes, yield the ergoline, lysergic acid. Lysergic acid (LA) is the substrate of lysergyl peptide synthetase, a nonribosomal peptide synthetase, which covalently links LA to the amino acids, L-alanine, L-proline, and L-phenylalanine. Enzyme-catalyzed or spontaneous cyclizations, oxygenations/oxidations, and isomerizations at selected residues precede, and give rise to, formation of ergotamine.

Medical uses
Ergotamine continues to be prescribed for migraines and cluster headaches.

Availability and dosage
In the United States, ergotamine is available as a suppository, a sublingual tablet, and a tablet, sometimes in combination with caffeine. The suppository is available under the brand name Migergot, which contains 2 mg of ergotamine with 100 mg caffeine.  The sublingual tablet is available under the brand name Ergomar and contains 2 mg of ergotamine. The combination tablet in combination with caffeine called Cafergot contains 1 mg of ergotamine and 100 mg of caffeine.

This preparation may be used immediately following the aura/onset of pain to abort the migraine. For the best results, dosage should start at the first sign of an attack.

Contraindications
Contraindications include: atherosclerosis, Buerger's syndrome, coronary artery disease, hepatic disease, pregnancy, pruritus, Raynaud's syndrome,  and renal disease.
It's also contraindicated if patient is taking macrolide antibiotics (e.g., erythromycin), certain HIV protease inhibitors (e.g., ritonavir, nelfinavir, indinavir), certain azole antifungals (e.g., ketoconazole, itraconazole, voriconazole) delavirdine, efavirenz, or a 5-HT1 receptor agonist (e.g., sumatriptan).

Side effects
Side effects of ergotamine include nausea and vomiting. At higher doses, it can cause raised arterial blood pressure, vasoconstriction (including coronary vasospasm) and bradycardia or tachycardia. Severe vasoconstriction may cause symptoms of intermittent claudication.

Pharmacology

Pharmacodynamics
Ergotamine interacts with serotonin, adrenergic, and dopamine receptors. It is an agonist of serotonin receptors including the 5-HT1 and 5-HT2 subtypes. Ergotamine is an agonist of the serotonin 5-HT2B receptor and has been associated with cardiac valvulopathy. Despite acting as a potent 5-HT2A receptor agonist, ergotamine is said to be non-hallucinogenic similarly to lisuride. This is thought to be due to functional selectivity at the 5-HT2A receptor.

Pharmacokinetics
The bioavailability of ergotamine is around 2% orally, 6% rectally, and 100% by intramuscular or intravenous injection. The low oral and rectal bioavailability is due to low gastrointestinal absorption and high first-pass metabolism.

Legal status
Ergotamine is included as a List I precursor in the United States, as it is a commonly used precursor for the production of LSD.

See also 
 Ergotism

References 

Alpha-1 blockers
Alpha-2 adrenergic receptor agonists
Antimigraine drugs
Biased ligands
Ergot alkaloids
Lactams
Lysergamides
Oxazolopyrrolopyrazines
Serotonin receptor agonists
Vasoconstrictors